Level Cross is an unincorporated community in Randolph County, North Carolina at  U.S. Route 220's intersection with Branson Mill Road.  Level Cross is located a few miles north of Randleman.

Naming
The community was so named on account of its flat main intersection, or level crossroads.

Notable people
Level Cross is the hometown of the Petty racing family, beginning with patriarch Lee and his sons, driver Richard and engine builder Maurice. Richard was born in Level Cross in 1937 and his brother Maurice was born there in 1939. It was also the birthplace of their cousin, crew chief Dale Inman in 1936.

References

Unincorporated communities in Randolph County, North Carolina
Unincorporated communities in North Carolina